The 2009 Ball State Cardinals football team represented Ball State University in the 2009 NCAA Division I FBS football season. Ball State competed as a member of the Mid-American Conference (MAC) West Division. The team was coached by Stan Parrish and played their homes game at Scheumann Stadium. The finished with a record of 2–10 (2–6 MAC).

Before the season

Recruiting

Schedule

Roster

Coaching staff

Game summaries

North Texas

Scoring Summary

1st Quarter
 09:24 NT Dunbar 3-yard run (Knott kick) 7–0 NT

2nd Quarter
 01:19 NT Knott 24-yard field goal 10–0 NT

3rd Quarter
 06:19 BSU McGarvey 21-yard field goal 10–3 NT

4th Quarter
 12:41 BSU Lewis 27-yard run (McGarvey kick) 10–10
 10:46 NT Outlaw 4-yard pass from Dodge (Knott kick) 17–10 NT
 07:36 NT Knott 19-yard field goal 20–10 NT

New Hampshire

Scoring Summary

1st Quarter
 12:42 BSU McGarvey 48-yard field goal 3–0 BSU
 09:25 BSU McGarvey 47-yard field goal 6–0 BSU

2nd Quarter
 13:50 UNH Jackson safety 6–2 BSU
 09:36 UNH Orlando 26-yard pass from R.J. Toman (Manning kick) 6–9 UNH
 03:16 UNH Jellison 5-yard run (Manning kick) 16–6 UNH

3rd Quarter
 11:12 BSU McGarvey 37-yard field goal 16–9 UNH
 03:47 UNH Jellison 8-yard run (Manning) 23–9 UNH

4th Quarter
 08:50 BSU White 21-yard pass from Page (McGarvey kick) 23–16 UNH

Army

Scoring Summary

1st Quarter
 06:22 ARMY Carter 1-yard run (Carlton kick) 7–0 ARMY
 03:51 BSU Page 15-yard run (McGarvey kick) 7–7

2nd Quarter
 13:37 ARMY Carlton 45-yard field goal 10–7 ARMY
 07:15 BSU McGarvey 30-yard field goal 10–10
 01:21 ARMY Villanueva 24-yard pass from Steelman (Carlton kick) 17–10 ARMY

3rd Quarter
 09:57 BSU Gibson 34-yard pass from Page (McGarvey kick) 17–17

4th Quarter
 06:41 ARMY Travis 18-yard interception return (Carlton kick) 24–17 ARMY

Auburn

Scoring Summary

1st Quarter
 12:26 BSU Lewis 2-yard run (McGarvey kick) 7–0 BSU
 2:53 AU Trott 6-yard pass from Todd (Byrum kick) 7–7

2nd Quarter
 13:47 AU Zachery 46-yard pass from Todd (Byrum kick) 7–14 AU
 12:53 AU Bynes safety 7–16 AU
 12:20 AU McCalebb 1-yard run (Byrum kick) 7–23 AU
 8:22 AU Zachery 65-yard pass from Todd (Byrum kick) 7–30 AU
 2:35 BSU McGarvey 33-yard field goal 10–30 AU
 0:07 AU Byrum 32-yard field goal 10–33 AU

3rd Quarter
 11:39 AU Adams 26-yard pass from Todd (Byrum kick) 10–40 AU
 8:50 BSU Page 21-yard run (McGarvey kick) 17–40 AU
 7:09 AU Fannin 36-yard pass from Todd (Byrum kick) 17–47 AU

4th Quarter
 12:39 BSU Fakes 1-yard pass from Page (McGarvey kick) 24–47 AU
 10:14 BSU McGarvey 37-yard field goal 27–47 AU
 7:19 AU Caudle 52-yard run (Byrum kick) 27–54 AU
 2:21 BSU McGarvey 33-yard field goal 30–54 AU

Toledo

Temple

Scoring Summary

1st Quarter
 07:12 TEMPLE McManus 27-yard field goal 0–3 TEMPLE
 04:47 TEMPLE Nixon 28-yard pass from Charlton (McManus kick) 0–10 TEMPLE

3rd Quarter
 10:59 BSU Gibson 50-yard pass from Page (McGarvey kick) 7–10 TEMPLE
 08:47 BSU Williams 0-yard fumble recovery (McGarvey kick failed) 13–10 BSU
 04:48 TEMPLE Pierce 2-yard run (McManus kick) 13–17 TEMPLE

4th Quarter
 03:29 TEMPLE Pierce 3-yard run (McManus kick) 13–24 TEMPLE
 00:00 BSU Ifft 2-yard pass from Page 19-24 TEMPLE

Bowling Green

Eastern Michigan

Scoring Summary

1st Quarter
 9:08 EMU Thayer 3-yard pass from McMahon (Carithers kick) 0–7 EMU
 4:52 BSU Sykes 51-yard run (Schott kick blocked) 6–7 EMU

2nd Quarter
 10:59 EMU Carithers 20-yard field goal 6–10 EMU
 9:23 EMU Welch 12-yard run (Carithers kick) 6–17 EMU
 6:37 EMU Carithers 26-yard field goal 6–20 EMU
 4:06 BSU Lewis 48-yard run (Schott kick) 13–20 EMU

3rd Quarter
 10:44 EMU White 10-yard run (Carithers kick) 13–27 EMU
 6:37 BSU Sykes 6-yard run (Schott kick) 20–27 EMU
 5:33 BSU Team Safety 22–27 EMU
 1:47 BSU Sykes 37-yard run (Schott kick) 29–27 BSU

Ohio

Scoring Summary

1st Quarter
 4:12 OHIO Weller 39-yard field goal 3–0 OHIO

2nd Quarter
 8:27 OHIO Weller 24-yard field goal 6–0 OHIO
 5:16 BSU Williams 1-yard run (McGarvey kick) 6–7 BSU
 0:00 OHIO Weller 52-yard field goal 9–7 OHIO

3rd Quarter
 6:45 BSU McGarvey 22-yard field goal 9–10 BSU

4th Quarter
 11:27 OHIO Weller 41-yard field goal 12–10 OHIO
 5:52 BSU Hill 35-yard pass from Justice (McGarvey kick) 12–17 BSU
 3:11 OHIO McCrae 7-yard pass from Scott (McCrae pass from Scott) 20–17 OHIO

Northern Illinois

Central Michigan

Western Michigan

References

Ball State
Ball State Cardinals football seasons
Ball State Cardinals football